Twin Falls is a waterfall located in the Silver Falls State Park at the east end of the city of Salem, in Marion County, in the U.S. state of Oregon. It is located in the west foothills where Mount Hood National Forest meets with the Middle Santiam Wilderness. Several prominent waterfalls are located in the Park along Trail of Ten Falls: South Falls, Drake Falls, Lower South Falls, and Winter Falls—among others.

Location 
Twin Falls is created along the course of North Fork of Silver Creek and it sits on the east section of Silver Falls State Park Trail of Ten Falls, along Canyon Trail towards North Falls Trail, approximately a quarter mile of Middle North Falls. It received its name because in the spring it splits into two channels.

Description 
Twin Falls is the third smallest along the Trail of Ten Falls and can't be fully viewed from the official view point on Canyon Trail. The far side channel will reduce its flow during the summer and becomes nearly impossible to visualize as it runs so close to its adjacent cliff.

See also 
 List of waterfalls in Oregon

References 

Parks in Marion County, Oregon
Waterfalls of Oregon